Olivia-Mai Barrett is an English actress, singer and dancer from London, United Kingdom. Having trained at Italia Conti Academy of Theatre Arts, she has appeared in commercials for companies such as Amazon and VO5, music videos, theatre and film and is most notable for her role of Penny in Penny on M.A.R.S. and Alex & Co. on the Disney Channel.

In 2019, she was the sole actress in the last of eight episodes of the BBC mini-series, Soon Gone: A Windrush Chronicle, a series showing life in the UK for successive generations of people with Caribbean heritage, as Michaela Williams. In The Observer, Kwame Kwei-Armah was quoted as saying "Her performance was incredible, I was amazed at how she brought such empathy and insight to the part". Barrett shares the same background as her character in the series, as her father is mixed-race and her grandfather Jamaican; the Windrush story is part of her family background.

In 2020 she starred in the film My Dad's Christmas Date.

Filmography

Television

Films

Music Videos

References

External links 
 

Living people
Actresses from London
English female dancers
English film actresses
English people of Jamaican descent
Alumni of the Italia Conti Academy of Theatre Arts